Jared Proffit (born 14 September 1993 in New Zealand) is a New Zealand rugby union player who plays for  in the National Provincial Championship. His playing position is prop.

Reference list

External links
itsrugby.co.uk profile

1993 births
New Zealand rugby union players
Living people
Rugby union props
Taranaki rugby union players
Hurricanes (rugby union) players
Chiefs (rugby union) players